This page shows all players of the professional basketball club Donar from Groningen, Netherlands from the period since 2011.

List (2011–present)

Notes

References 

rosters